Lak Hok (Rangsit University) Station is a railway station in Thanyaburi District, Pathum Thani Province. It serves the SRT Dark Red Line.

History 
Lak Hok opened in 1898 as a railway station as part of Thailand's first railway between Bangkok and Ayutthaya. It was reduced to a railway halt during sometime in the 20th century and remained as a ground-level railway halt on the State Railway of Thailand's Northern and Northeastern Main Line which primarily served commuter trains. The halt officially closed on 15 September 2020 in preparation for the opening of the Dark Red Line.

The new Lak Hok station was built in 2013 during the construction of the SRT Dark Red Line. It was initially named only as Lak Hok Station to reflect the existing halt, but "Rangsit University" was added afterwards to increase public awareness about its location close to the Rangsit University main campus. The station opened on 2 August 2021 following the opening of the line.

References 

Pathum Thani province
Railway stations in Thailand